Vaire-le-Petit is a former commune in the Doubs department in the Franche-Comté region in eastern France. On 1 June 2016, it was merged into the new commune of Vaire.

Population

See also
 Vaire-Arcier, on the opposite side of the river Doubs

References

Former communes of Doubs